John Caffrey (born  1958) is a Gaelic footballer who played for the CLG Na Fianna club and for the Dublin county team. Caffrey won an All-Ireland Senior Football Championship medal with Dublin in 1983. He also won four leinster titles (1979, 1983, 1984 and 1985) along with two Sigerson Cup medals with UCD in 1978 and 1979.  John is the brother of the previous Dublin senior football manager, Paul Caffrey.  He is a teacher in St Declan's C.B.S., Nephin Road, Dublin 7.

References
Article on the Summer of 83'

1950s births
Living people
Dublin inter-county Gaelic footballers
Irish schoolteachers
Na Fianna Gaelic footballers
Winners of one All-Ireland medal (Gaelic football)